Nebria metallica is a species of ground beetle in the subfamily Nebriinae first described by Gotthelf Fischer von Waldheim in 1822. It ranges from the Aleutian Islands, southern Alaska, and western Canada south to Washington and Montana.

References

metallica
Beetles described in 1822
Beetles of North America